Ben Skora was an American inventor residing in Palos Hills, Illinois, who specialized in robotics and home automation.  He often worked with spare parts obtained from junk yards or discarded by others.  He was best known for building Arok, a humanoid robot which was highly advanced for its time in the late 1970s.  Arok was able to move in any direction at up to 3 mph, lift 125 pounds and bend 45 degrees at the waist. It was able to perform routine household tasks such as serving drinks, taking out the trash and walking the dog.

His home included many of his creations including a drivable motorized easy chair, an automatic retractable soap dispenser, dressers that slide away to reveal a hallway to another room, and a ski slope from the roof.

He appeared in the magazines People and Cosmopolitan, on the TV shows Real People and Ripley's Believe It or Not! and the Chris Smith film Home Movie (2001).

His home in Palos Hills was torn down on November 28, 2014.

On October 9, 2015, his cousin Tom Skora donated Arok (the name comes from Skora's last named spelled backward minus the S) to Moraine Valley Community College in Palos Hills.

Health

In 2013 Skora, who had Alzheimer's disease, was moved into an assisted-care center in Hickory Hills, Illinois, by his family. His cousin Tom Skora had Ben's power of attorney. Skora died in October 2018.

References

American inventors
2018 deaths
Year of birth missing
People from Palos Hills, Illinois